Stephen Muir is an Australian Paralympic amputee athletics competitor from the Sunshine Coast, Queensland.

He was born without any hands.
At the 1984 New York Games, he won a silver medal in the Men's Triple Jump A5.

He supported his athletics career by operating a lawn mowing business. In 2005, he worked as a traffic controller and a groundsman. In 2005, he was awarded a certificate for fifteen years service to Queensland State Emergency Service.

References 

Paralympic athletes of Australia
Athletes (track and field) at the 1984 Summer Paralympics
Paralympic silver medalists for Australia
Triple jumpers with limb difference
Living people
Year of birth missing (living people)
Medalists at the 1984 Summer Paralympics
Paralympic medalists in athletics (track and field)
Australian male triple jumpers
Paralympic triple jumpers